Uno is an album by the Costa Rican band Malpaís, released in 2003.

Track listing
"Boceto para Esperanza"
"Muchacha y Luna"
"Abril"
"Tras el Ventanal"
"Otro Lugar"
"Son Inú"
"Zapateao"
"Epitafio"
"Como un Pájaro"
"Malpaís"
"La Chola"

References

Malpaís (group) albums
Spanish-language albums
2003 albums